The Connacht Junior Hurling Championship is a junior "knockout" competition in the game of Hurling played in the province of Connacht in Ireland. The series of games are organised by the Connacht Council.

The winners of the Connacht Junior Hurling Championship each year progress to play the other provincial champions for a chance to win the All-Ireland Junior Hurling Championship. The championship was first played for in 1925. The province was represented by Galway in the years 1913 to 1915, 1923 to 1924 and 1927 and 1938. Since 1976, the competition has only been played once – in 2004 when Mayo beat Sligo. In the years 1983 to 1996, the province was again represented by Galway. Since 2005, the 4 weaker counties in the province have competed instead in the Christy Ring Cup, Nicky Rackard Cup and Lory Meagher Cup. The fifth county – Galway – have instead represented Connacht in the All-Ireland Intermediate Hurling Championship.

Roll of honour

Sources
 Complete Roll of Honour Available Here

See also
 Munster Junior Hurling Championship
 Leinster Junior Hurling Championship
 Ulster Junior Hurling Championship

Connacht GAA inter-county hurling competitions